East Carbon-Sunnyside was a city in Carbon County, Utah, United States. East Carbon-Sunnyside was incorporated on January 1, 2014, from the merger of the cities of East Carbon and Sunnyside. East Carbon-Sunnyside was a temporary name, to be used until the city council could adopt a permanent name.
As of January 1, 2016 the merged cities are officially known as East Carbon City.
Encompassing the subdivisions of Columbia, Dragerton and Sunnyside.

As of the 2010 census, East Carbon had a population of 1,301, while Sunnyside had a population of 377, for a combined population of 1,678. In 2018 East Carbon-Sunnyside had an estimated population of 1,475.

Demographics

References

Former populated places in Carbon County, Utah
Former cities in Utah